Mohavea breviflora is a species of flowering plant in the plantain family known by the common names golden desert-snapdragon and lesser mohavea. It is native to the southwestern United States, including the Mojave Desert and surrounding areas.

Description
It is a hairy annual herb growing erect to a maximum height near 20 centimeters. The alternately arranged leaves are lance-shaped. Flowers occur in the leaf axils. They are about 2 centimeters wide and divided into an upper lip with two lobes and a swollen lower lip with three. The flower is yellow with scattered red speckles.

References

External links
Jepson Manual Treatment
USDA Plants Profile
Photo gallery

Plantaginaceae
Natural history of the Mojave Desert
Flora of Arizona
Flora of California
Flora of Nevada
Flora of Utah
Flora of the California desert regions
Flora without expected TNC conservation status